Edward Griffith may refer to:

Edward Griffith (zoologist) (1790–1858), British naturalist and solicitor
Edward O. Griffith, British sculptor
Edward H. Griffith (1894–1975), American film director, screenwriter and producer
Edward Griffith (MP), member of parliament  for Caernarfon
Teddy Griffith (born 1936), West Indian cricketer
Edward Griffith (politician), American New York State Assembly member

See also
Edward Griffiths (disambiguation)
Edward Griffith Colpoys (c. 1767–1832), Royal Navy officer